Brandon Guffey (born January 29, 1980) is an American Politician of the Republican Party. He served for many years as a Precinct president over his local precinct along with being President of his HOA.  He is currently a member of the South Carolina House of Representatives representing District 48.

Representative Guffey began his political career as the York County Councilman representing district 6 after defeating incumbent county council former chairman and former Chair of the York County Republicans Britt Blackwell in a 2020 primary runoff.

In the 2022 general election for South Carolina House of Representatives District 48 Rep. Guffey replaced retiring Representative Bruce M. Bryant. Guffey had two challengers in the 2022 primary election and was the top vote winning 43% but did not break the 51% rule in South Carolina so there was a runoff between the top two. Guffey won a primary runoff 57% to 43% Guffey serves on the Judiciary Committee. In the general election, Guffey swept every precinct in District 48 winning 67% of the vote.

Representative Guffey experienced the tragic loss of his oldest son Gavin by suicide related to Sextortion in July.  He has since become a spokesperson for mental health and online crimes.  He has videos posted on Facebook recounting a consistent live reaction of emotions as he dealt with his families loss.  In addition he has posted a tell all video on YouTube.  He has also done interviews regarding “Sextortion” with CN2 News, WSOCTV, FitsNews, and The Post and Courier. 

Guffey pre-filed a bill that would make 'Sextortion' a felony in South Carolina (H3583). Guffey has been assigned to the House Judiciary committee as a freshman along with House Regulations and Administrative Procedures committee. General session started January 10, 2023

References 

Members of the South Carolina House of Representatives

1980 births
Living people